Ian John Darlington (born 2 November 1977) is an English cricketer.  Darlington is a right-handed batsman who bowls right-arm medium pace.  He was born at Derby, Derbyshire.

Darlington represented the Derbyshire Cricket Board in List A cricket.  His debut List A match came against  Wales Minor Counties in the 1999 NatWest Trophy.  From 1999 to 2000, he represented the Board in 6 matches, the last of which came against the Middlesex Cricket Board in the 1st round of the 2003 Cheltenham & Gloucester Trophy which was held in 2002.  In his 6 List A matches, he scored 163 runs at a batting average of 32.60, with a single half century high score of 58.  With the ball he took 4 wickets at a bowling average of 50.50, with best figures of 3/19.

Darlington currently plays club cricket for Ockbrook and Borrowash Cricket Club in the Derbyshire Premier Cricket League.

References

External links
Ian Darlington at Cricinfo
Ian Darlington at CricketArchive

1977 births
Living people
Cricketers from Derby
English cricketers
Derbyshire Cricket Board cricketers